The Pidgeon process is one of the methods of magnesium metal production, via a silicothermic reduction. Practical production requires roughly 35–40 MWh/ton of metal produced, which is on par with the molten salt electrolytic methods of production, though above the 7 MWh/ton theoretical minimum.

Chemistry
The basic chemical equation of this process is:
 Si(s) + 2 MgO(s) → SiO2(s) + 2 Mg(g) (high temperature, distillation boiling zone)

Silicon and magnesia react to produce silica and magnesium.

Though according to Ellingham diagrams this reaction  is thermodynamically unfavorable, in accordance with the Le Chatelier's principle of equilibria it can still be driven to the right by continuous supply of heat, and by removing one of the products, namely distilling out the magnesium vapor. The atmospheric pressure boiling point of magnesium metal is relatively low, only 1090 °C, and even lower in vacuum. Vacuum is preferred, because it allows lower temperatures.

The most commonly used and cheapest form of silicon is as a ferrosilicon alloy. The iron from the alloy is but a spectator in the reactions.

The magnesium raw material of this reaction is magnesium oxide, which can be obtained by several ways. In all cases the raw materials have to be calcined to remove both water and carbon dioxide, which would be gaseous at reaction temperatures, and follow the magnesium vapor around and revert the reaction.

One way is by sea or lakewater magnesium chloride hydrolyzed to hydroxide, which is then calcined to magnesium oxide by removal of water. Another way is using mined magnesite that has been calcined to magnesium oxide by carbon dioxide removal.

By far the most used raw material is mined dolomite, a mixed , where the calcium oxide present in the reaction zone scavenges the silica formed, releasing heat and consuming one of the products, thus helping push the equilibrium to the right.

 (Ca,Mg)CO3(s) → CaO.MgO(s)+ CO2(g) (dolomite calcining)
 (Fe,Si)(s) + 2 MgO(s) ↔ Fe(s) + SiO2(s) + 2 Mg(g)
 CaO + SiO2 → CaSiO3

The Pidgeon process is a batch process in which finely powdered calcined dolomite and ferrosilicon are mixed, briquetted, and charged in retorts made of nickel-chrome-steel alloy. The hot reaction zone portion of the retort is either gas fired, coal fired, or electrically heated in a furnace, while the condensing section equipped with removable baffles extends from the furnace and is water-cooled. Due to distillation, very high purity magnesium crowns are produced, which are then remelted and cast into ingots.

Carbothermic route 

The Carbothermic route to magnesium has long been recognised as a low energy path to magnesium extraction. It was first pioneered in the 1920s by Fritz Johann Hansgirg, and improvements have been made since. Solutions need to address the reversion rate. The chemistry is as follows:
  C(s) + MgO(s) → CO(g) + Mg(g)

Historical background 

This process was invented in the early 1940s by Lloyd Montgomery Pidgeon of the Canadian National Research Council (NRC). The first plant was built in 1941 and operated by Dominion Magnesium in Haley Station, Ontario. This plant operated for 63 years, most recently by Timminco Metals.

The silicothermic reduction of dolomite was first developed by Amati in 1938 at the University of Padua, where his thesis is archived. Immediately afterward, an industrial production was established in Bolzano, using what is now known as the Bolzano process. The process uses externally heated retorts similar in concept to those used by Pidgeon two years later.

In the last 10 years, the Pidgeon process has come to dominate world magnesium production. China is the dominant magnesium metal supplier, relying almost exclusively on this method.

Prior to the mid-1990s the world market for magnesium metal production was dominated by electrolytic processes, with the United States as the dominant supplier. For over 80 years Dow Chemical operated via  a 65 kton/y capacity plant near Freeport, TX, based on seawater extracted magnesium chloride electrolysis. Dow was the prime magnesium metal supplier until the plant closure in 1998. As of 2005, there is a single US producer, in Utah, US Magnesium, a company borne from now-defunct Magcorp. Antidumping tariffs at a rate of 111% ad valorem were imposed on Chinese imports early in the Obama administration. By 2017, the US tariffs on Tianjin Magnesium International and Tianjin Magnesium Metal had climbed to 339.6%.

As of 2005, the US produced about 45 out of a 615 kton/yr (7%), compared to 140 out of 311 kton/yr (45%) in 1995. In contrast, in 2005 China produced 400 out of the 615 kton/yr (65%), compared to 12 out of 311 kton/yr (4%) in 1995. The price of magnesium metal plummeted from $2300/t in 1995 to $1300/t by 2001, but in 2004 climbed back over $2300/t, due to increased ferrosilicon, energy and transportation costs, and in anticipation of severe antidumping duties throughout the world.

As stated above, the energy efficiency of thermal processes is comparable to electrolytic ones, both requiring roughly 35-40 MWh/ton. The Pidgeon method is less complex technologically, and because of distillation/vapor deposition conditions, a high purity product is easily achievable.

In the past, besides the US, the other major magnesium producers have traditionally included Norsk Hydro of Norway/Canada, and to a lesser extent, the former Soviet Union countries, Brazil and France, all possessing cheap and abundant hydroelectric or nuclear electric power. Israel is home to a new market entrant, while in June 2004 Australian company Magnesium International planned a 100 kton/yr smelter at Sokhna in Egypt, using the Dow electrolytic process.

References

External sources
USGS up to date and historical data
A USEPA datafile example
World Trends, Markets - Dec 2002
Energy efficiency reference

Chemical processes
Magnesium
Metallurgical processes